Alok Ranjan (born 9 March 1956) is a retired 1978 batch IAS officer from the U.P Cadre. He retired on 1 July 2016 after holding the office of Chief Secretary for the Government of Uttar Pradesh for over two years.

After retirement, he was appointed as the Chief Adviser to Chief Minister of U.P and Chairman U.P.S.I.D.C (Uttar Pradesh State Industrial Development Corporation). He resigned from this post following the defeat of the ruling Samajwadi Party government in the state assembly elections.

References

Indian Administrative Service officers
Indian Institute of Management Ahmedabad alumni
St. Stephen's College, Delhi alumni
1956 births
Living people
People from Unnao
Chief Secretaries of Uttar Pradesh